Titlow Beach is in Tacoma, Washington, USA. It is located along Puget Sound near the Tacoma Narrows Bridge. It has a beach, community center, park, water play area (all of which are run by Metro Parks Tacoma), two restaurants., a view of the Tacoma Narrows Bridge, a small boardwalk, and is a popular scuba diving area.

History

Local lawyer Aaron R. Titlow purchased the property in 1903 and built the Hotel Hesperides, a resort hotel that lasted until 1923.  In 1926, the hotel was acquired by the park district.  During the 1930s, it was remodeled during a WPA project.  In 1963, octopus wrestling championships were held at the beach.  The lodge served as the home of the assistant superintendent for parks and then the caretaker for the park until 1990.  It was remodeled in 2011, and the pool was replaced in 2013 with a water play area.

References

External links 
Metro Parks Tacoma Park Webpage
Titlow Beach Lodge History
Pictures of the Titlow Beach Park
 Diving Info
Titlow Beach Letterbox (also has information about Titlow Beach)
Diving Info
Park Info

Beaches of Washington (state)
North Tacoma, Washington
Parks in Pierce County, Washington
Landforms of Pierce County, Washington
Tourist attractions in Tacoma, Washington